Cincar is a mountain in the Dinaric Alps of western Bosnia and Herzegovina, located at 
between Livno, Kupres and Glamoč.

References

External links
 Cincar at SummitPost.org

Mountains of Bosnia and Herzegovina
Dinaric Alps
Two-thousanders of Bosnia and Herzegovina